Dutch Charts, GfK Dutch Charts, MegaCharts is a chart company responsible for producing a number of official charts in the Netherlands, of which the Single Top 100 and the Album Top 100 are the most known ones. Dutch Charts are also part of GfK Benelux Marketing Services.

The Mega Charts
Singles and Tracks
Single Top 100
Single Tip

Albums
Album Top 100
Compilation Top 30 
Combi Album Top 100
Backcatalogue Top 50

DVDs and others
Dance Top 30
Midprice Top 50
Music DVD Top 30
Film DVD Top 30
Game Top 10

References

External links
 

Music organisations based in the Netherlands